Michael Gregory Dunlap (born May 27, 1957) is an American professional basketball coach who is an assistant coach for the Milwaukee Bucks of the National Basketball Association (NBA). Dunlap is the former head coach of the NBA's Charlotte Bobcats.

Career
Dunlap served three seasons in Australia (1994–1996) as head coach of the Adelaide 36ers in the National Basketball League. Dunlap was successful in taking the team to the NBL Grand Final in 1994 against the North Melbourne Giants and the semi-finals in 1995 and 1996. Over his three season in Adelaide Dunlap compiled a 59–36 record before returning to the USA just weeks before the 1997 season following the sudden death of his father. Dunlap is credited as the coach who kick-started the NBL career of the 36ers all-time leading home grown player Brett Maher.

He served as head coach at Metro State in Denver (1997–2006). As the leader of the Metro State Roadrunners Dunlap led the program to 2 National Championships in the 2000 and 2002 seasons.  As the Architect of the greatest years in the Roadrunner history he was named The National Association of Basketball Coaches Coach of the year in 2000 and 2002. He was assistant coach for the Denver Nuggets (2006–2008). He served as associate head coach at the University of Arizona (2008–2009) and the University of Oregon (2009–2010), and was interim head coach and associate head coach at St. John's University (2010–2012).

In the 2011–12 NBA season the Charlotte Bobcats record was an NBA worst ever 7–59. Dunlap joined the team on June 20, 2012. In the early part of the 2012–13 season, the Bobcats had a 7–5 record, with Charlotte matching its win total from the previous season.  However, at that point they suffered many injuries and played many young players. They ultimately finished 21–61. Dunlap became the only coach in NBA history to triple a team's win total from the previous season. On April 23, 2013, the Bobcats announced that Dunlap would not be returning as coach. 

Dunlap joined Loyola Marymount as head coach in 2014. During his tenure at Loyola Marymount, Dunlap helped guide steady growth in the Lions from an 8–23 team in the 2014–15 season to 15–15 by 2016–17.  In the 2018–19 season, Dunlap led the lions to a 22-win season. They were crowned the champions of the Jamaica Classic, where they upset Georgetown University.  The 2018–2019 season culminated in an appearance in the 2019 College Basketball Invitational. This is the third-best record in the history of the program. With a very impressive group of returning players and a good incoming recruiting class, the 2019–20 season appeared to be bright. Season-ending injuries to 2 starters and a tragedy in another starter's family made Dunlap and the Lions play short-handed during the entire 2019–20 season. LMU and Dunlap agreed to part ways after six seasons on March 8, 2020.  Dunlap finished his career at his alma mater with 81 total wins, which is fifth-most all-time in program history. 

On November 17, 2020, Dunlap was hired as an assistant coach by the Milwaukee Bucks. Dunlap won his first championship when the Bucks defeated the Phoenix Suns in 6 games in the 2021 NBA Finals.

Coaching record

NBA

|- 
| align="left" |Charlotte
| align="left" |
|82||21||61|||| align="center" |4th in Southeast ||—||—||—||—
| align="center" |Missed Playoffs
|-class="sortbottom"
| align="left" |Career
| ||82||21||61|||| ||—||—||—||—||

NBL

|- 
| align="left" |Adelaide 36ers
| align="left" |1994
|26||18||8|||| align="center" |4th ||7||4||3||
| align="center" |Grand Finalist
|-class="sortbottom"
|- 
| align="left" |Adelaide 36ers
| align="left" |1995
|26||17||9|||| align="center" |4th ||5||2||3||
| align="center" |Semi-finals
|-class="sortbottom"
|- 
| align="left" |Adelaide 36ers
| align="left" |1996
|26||16||10|||| align="center" |6th ||5||2||3||
| align="center" |Semi-finals
|-class="sortbottom"
| align="left" |Career
| ||78||51||27|||| ||17||8||9||||

College

References

External links

 Loyola Marymount profile
 St. John's profile

1957 births
Living people
Adelaide 36ers coaches
American men's basketball coaches
American men's basketball players
Arizona Wildcats men's basketball coaches
Basketball coaches from Alaska
Basketball players from Alaska
Cal Lutheran Kingsmen basketball coaches
Charlotte Bobcats head coaches
College men's basketball head coaches in the United States
Denver Nuggets assistant coaches
Iowa Hawkeyes men's basketball coaches
Los Angeles Pierce Brahmas men's basketball players
Loyola Marymount Lions men's basketball coaches
Metro State Roadrunners men's basketball coaches
Milwaukee Bucks assistant coaches
National Basketball League (Australia) coaches
Oregon Ducks men's basketball coaches
Sportspeople from Fairbanks, Alaska
St. John's Red Storm men's basketball coaches
USC Trojans men's basketball coaches
Alaska Goldpanners of Fairbanks players